Modivcare Inc. is an Atlanta, Georgia-based American social services corporation listed on the NASDAQ.

Overview
ModivCare Inc. previously known as Providence Service Corporation was established in 1997. It has a payroll of approximately 17,500 as of 2021. Its chairman is Christopher S. Shackelton, its chief executive officer is Daniel E. Greenleaf, and its chief operating officer is Kenneth Wilson.

The company provides social services, and it is "reimbursed by government programs such as welfare, juvenile justice, Medicaid or corrections." It consists of five brands: Modivcare, (Formerly LogistiCare), Circulation, National Medtrans, Providence Services Corporation, and Simplura.

It is listed on the NASDAQ.

References

Companies listed on the Nasdaq
Companies established in 1997
Companies based in Stamford, Connecticut